Olgino is a historical area in Lakhta-Olgino Municipal Okrug of St. Petersburg, Russia, located south-west of the area of Lakhta and east of Lisy Nos. This part of the Neva Bay coast was owned in the mid-19th century by Count Stenbock-Fermor, of Swedish provenance, who bestowed upon it the name of his wife Olga. In the early 20th century, Olgino emerged as a prosperous dacha village north of the Russian capital. Among its inhabitants was the poet Korney Chukovsky. Olgino was incorporated into the city of Leningrad in January 1963. It is considered St. Petersburg's counterpart to Rublyovka, the most exclusive neighbourhood of Moscow.

Office of trolls 

From the summer of 2013, there was a base of at least hundred internet trolls in Olgino, who were paid for distributing messages via Internet to support Russian propaganda.

 In October 2014 it became known that the trolls had moved to Savushkina street (Primorskiy district in St. Peterburg).

 In a sense, "Olgino" can be met nowadays as a way to call names, as in "kind regards to Olgino comrades".

References

External links 

Primorsky District, Saint Petersburg